Hugo Pepper is a children's book written by Paul Stewart and illustrated by Chris Riddell, published in 2006. It won the Nestlé Children's Book Prize Silver Award and was longlisted for the Carnegie Medal.

Plot introduction
This story is set in the same world as Fergus Crane and Corby Flood. It stars Hugo Pepper, a young boy who was raised by reindeer herders after his parents were eaten by polar bears. When Hugo discovers that his parents' sled has a very special compass which can be set to 'Home', he sets off to find where his true home is. As he does this, he unravels the mystery of The Firefly Quarterly's Institute disaster and the treasure of his great-great-grandmother, Brimstone Kate.

References

2006 British novels
British children's novels
Children's fantasy novels
2006 children's books
Doubleday (publisher) books